The history of aviation extends for more than two thousand years, from the earliest forms of aviation such as kites and attempts at tower jumping to supersonic and hypersonic flight by powered, heavier-than-air jets.

Kite flying in China dates back to several hundred years BC and slowly spread around the world. It is thought to be the earliest example of man-made flight. Leonardo da Vinci's 15th-century dream of flight found expression in several rational designs, but which relied on poor science.

The discovery of hydrogen gas in the 18th century led to the invention of the hydrogen balloon, at almost exactly the same time that the Montgolfier brothers rediscovered the hot-air balloon and began manned flights. Various theories in mechanics by physicists during the same period of time, notably fluid dynamics and Newton's laws of motion, led to the foundation of modern aerodynamics, most notably by Sir George Cayley. Balloons, both free-flying and tethered, began to be used for military purposes from the end of the 18th century, with the French government establishing Balloon Companies during the Revolution.

Experiments with gliders provided the groundwork for heavier-than-air craft, most notably by Otto Lilienthal, and by the early 20th century, advances in engine technology and aerodynamics made controlled, powered flight possible for the first time, thanks to the successful efforts of the Wright brothers. The modern aeroplane with its characteristic tail was established by 1909 and from then on the history of the aeroplane became tied to the development of more and more powerful engines.

The first great ships of the air were the rigid dirigible balloons pioneered by Ferdinand von Zeppelin, which soon became synonymous with airships and dominated long-distance flight until the 1930s, when large flying boats became popular. After World War II, the flying boats were in their turn replaced by land planes, and the new and immensely powerful jet engine revolutionised both air travel and military aviation.

In the latter part of the 20th century, the advent of digital electronics produced great advances in flight instrumentation and "fly-by-wire" systems. The 21st century saw the large-scale use of pilotless drones for military, civilian and leisure use. With digital controls, inherently unstable aircraft such as flying wings became possible.

Etymology
The term aviation, noun of action from stem of Latin avis "bird" with suffix -ation meaning action or progress, was coined in 1863 by French pioneer Guillaume Joseph Gabriel de La Landelle (1812–1886) in "Aviation ou Navigation aérienne sans ballons".

Primitive beginnings

Tower jumping

Since antiquity, there have been stories of men strapping birdlike wings, stiffened cloaks or other devices to themselves and attempting to fly, typically by jumping off a tower. The Greek legend of Daedalus and Icarus is one of the earliest known; others originated from ancient Asia and the European Middle Age. During this early period, the issues of lift, stability and control were not understood, and most attempts ended in serious injury or death.

The Andalusian scientist Abbas ibn Firnas (810–887 AD) is claimed to have made a jump in Córdoba, Spain, covering his body with vulture feathers and attaching two wings to his arms. The 17th-century Algerian historian Ahmed Mohammed al-Maqqari, quoting a poem by Muhammad I of Córdoba's 9th-century court poet Mu'min ibn Said, recounts that Firnas flew some distance before landing with some injuries, attributed to his lacking a tail (as birds use to land). Writing in the 12th century, William of Malmesbury stated that the 11th-century Benedictine monk Eilmer of Malmesbury attached wings to his hands and feet and flew a short distance, but broke both legs while landing, also having neglected to make himself a tail.

Many others made well-documented jumps in the following centuries. As late as 1811, Albrecht Berblinger constructed an ornithopter and jumped into the Danube at Ulm.

Kites

The kite may have been the first form of man-made aircraft. It was invented in China possibly as far back as the 5th century BC by Mozi (Mo Di) and Lu Ban (Gongshu Ban). Later designs often emulated flying insects, birds, and other beasts, both real and mythical. Some were fitted with strings and whistles to make musical sounds while flying. Ancient and medieval Chinese sources describe kites being used to measure distances, test the wind, lift men, signal, and communicate and send messages.

Kites spread from China around the world. After its introduction into India, the kite further evolved into the fighter kite, which has an abrasive line used to cut down other kites.

Man-carrying kites
Man-carrying kites are believed to have been used extensively in ancient China, for both civil and military purposes and sometimes enforced as a punishment. An early recorded flight was that of the prisoner Yuan Huangtou, a Chinese prince, in the 6th century AD. Stories of man-carrying kites also occur in Japan, following the introduction of the kite from China around the seventh century AD. It is said that at one time there was a Japanese law against man-carrying kites.

Rotor wings 

The use of a rotor for vertical flight has existed since 400 BC in the form of the bamboo-copter, an ancient Chinese toy. The similar "moulinet à noix" (rotor on a nut) appeared in Europe in the 14th century AD.

Hot air balloons
From ancient times the Chinese have understood that hot air rises and have applied the principle to a type of small hot air balloon called a sky lantern. A sky lantern consists of a paper balloon under or just inside which a small lamp is placed. Sky lanterns are traditionally launched for pleasure and during festivals. According to Joseph Needham, such lanterns were known in China from the 3rd century BC. Their military use is attributed to the general Zhuge Liang (180–234 AD, honorific title Kongming), who is said to have used them to scare the enemy troops.

There is evidence that the Chinese also "solved the problem of aerial navigation" using balloons, hundreds of years before the 18th century.

Renaissance 

Eventually, after Ibn Firnas's construction, some investigators began to discover and define some of the basics of rational aircraft design. Most notable of these was Leonardo da Vinci, although his work remained unknown until 1797, and so had no influence on developments over the next three hundred years. While his designs are rational, they are not scientific. He particularly underestimated the amount of power that would be needed to propel a flying object, basing his designs on the flapping wings of a bird rather than an engine-powered propeller.

Leonardo studied bird and bat flight, claiming the superiority of the latter owing to its unperforated wing. He analyzed these and anticipating many principles of aerodynamics. He understood that "An object offers as much resistance to the air as the air does to the object." Isaac Newton would not publish his third law of motion until 1687.

From the last years of the 15th century until 1505, Leonardo wrote about and sketched many designs for flying machines and mechanisms, including ornithopters, fixed-wing gliders, rotorcraft (perhaps inspired by whirligig toys), parachutes (in the form of a wooden-framed pyramidal tent) and a wind speed gauge. His early designs were man-powered and included ornithopters and rotorcraft; however he came to realise the impracticality of this and later turned to controlled gliding flight, also sketching some designs powered by a spring.

In an essay titled Sul volo (On flight), Leonardo describes a flying machine called "the bird" which he built from starched linen, leather joints, and raw silk thongs. In the Codex Atlanticus, he wrote, "Tomorrow morning, on the second day of January, 1496, I will make the thong and the attempt." According to one commonly repeated, albeit presumably fictional story, in 1505 Leonardo or one of his pupils attempted to fly from the summit of Monte Ceceri.

Lighter than air

Beginnings of modern theories
In 1670, Francesco Lana de Terzi published a work that suggested lighter than air flight would be possible by using copper foil spheres that, containing a vacuum, would be lighter than the displaced air to lift an airship. While theoretically sound, his design was not feasible: the pressure of the surrounding air would crush the spheres.  The idea of using a vacuum to produce lift is now known as vacuum airship but remains unfeasible with any current materials.
 
In 1709, Bartolomeu de Gusmão presented a petition to King John V of Portugal, begging for support for his invention of an airship, in which he expressed the greatest confidence. The public test of the machine, which was set for 24 June 1709, did not take place. According to contemporary reports, however, Gusmão appears to have made several less ambitious experiments with this machine, descending from eminences. It is certain that Gusmão was working on this principle at the public exhibition he gave before the Court on 8 August 1709, in the hall of the Casa da Índia in Lisbon, when he propelled a ball to the roof by combustion.

Balloons 

 

1783 was a watershed year for ballooning and aviation. Between 4 June and 1 December, five aviation firsts were achieved in France:
 On 4 June, the Montgolfier brothers demonstrated their unmanned hot air balloon at Annonay, France.
 On 27 August, Jacques Charles and the Robert brothers (Les Freres Robert) launched the world's first unmanned hydrogen-filled balloon, from the Champ de Mars, Paris.
 On 19 October, the Montgolfiers launched the first manned flight, a tethered balloon with humans on board, at the Folie Titon in Paris. The aviators were the scientist Jean-François Pilâtre de Rozier, the manufacture manager Jean-Baptiste Réveillon, and Giroud de Villette.
 On 21 November, the Montgolfiers launched the first free flight with human passengers. King Louis XVI had originally decreed that condemned criminals would be the first pilots, but Jean-François Pilâtre de Rozier, along with the Marquis François d'Arlandes, successfully petitioned for the honor. They drifted  in a balloon-powered by a wood fire.
 On 1 December, Jacques Charles and the Nicolas-Louis Robert launched their manned hydrogen balloon from the Jardin des Tuileries in Paris, as a crowd of 400,000 witnessed. They ascended to a height of about [15] and landed at sunset in Nesles-la-Vallée after a flight of 2 hours and 5 minutes, covering 36 km. After Robert alighted Charles decided to ascend alone.

Ballooning became a major "rage" in Europe in the late 18th century, providing the first detailed understanding of the relationship between altitude and the atmosphere.

Non-steerable balloons were employed during the American Civil War by the Union Army Balloon Corps. The young Ferdinand von Zeppelin first flew as a balloon passenger with the Union Army of the Potomac in 1863.

In the early 1900s, ballooning was a popular sport in Britain. These privately owned balloons usually used coal gas as the lifting gas. This has half the lifting power of hydrogen so the balloons had to be larger, however, coal gas was far more readily available and the local gas works sometimes provided a special lightweight formula for ballooning events.

Airships 

Airships were originally called "dirigible balloons" and are still sometimes called dirigibles today.

Work on developing a steerable (or dirigible) balloon continued sporadically throughout the 19th century. The first powered, controlled, sustained lighter-than-air flight is believed to have taken place in 1852 when Henri Giffard flew  in France, with a steam engine driven craft.

Another advance was made in 1884, when the first fully controllable free-flight was made in a French Army electric-powered airship, La France, by Charles Renard and Arthur Krebs.

However, these aircraft were generally short-lived and extremely frail. Routine, controlled flights would not occur until the advent of the internal combustion engine (see below.)

The first aircraft to make routine controlled flights were non-rigid airships (sometimes called "blimps".) The most successful early pioneering pilot of this type of aircraft was the Brazilian Alberto Santos-Dumont who effectively combined a balloon with an internal combustion engine. On 19 October 1901, he flew his airship Number 6 over Paris from the Parc de Saint Cloud around the Eiffel Tower and back in under 30 minutes to win the Deutsch de la Meurthe prize. Santos-Dumont went on to design and build several aircraft. The subsequent controversy surrounding his and others' competing claims with regard to aircraft overshadowed his great contribution to the development of airships.

At the same time that non-rigid airships were starting to have some success, the first successful rigid airships were also being developed. These would be far more capable than fixed-wing aircraft in terms of pure cargo carrying capacity for decades. Rigid airship design and advancement was pioneered by the German count Ferdinand von Zeppelin.

Construction of the first Zeppelin airship began in 1899 in a floating assembly hall on Lake Constance in the Bay of Manzell, Friedrichshafen. This was intended to ease the starting procedure, as the hall could easily be aligned with the wind.

Its first flight, on 2 July 1900, lasted for only 18 minutes, as LZ 1 was forced to land on the lake after the winding mechanism for the balancing weight had broken. Upon repair, the technology proved its potential in subsequent flights, bettering the 6 m/s speed attained by the French airship La France by 3 m/s, but could not yet convince possible investors. It would be several years before the Count was able to raise enough funds for another try.

German airship passenger service known as DELAG (Deutsche-Luftschiffahrts AG) was established in 1910.

Although airships were used in both World War I and II, and continue on a limited basis to this day, their development has been largely overshadowed by heavier-than-air craft.

Heavier than air

17th and 18th centuries
Italian inventor Tito Livio Burattini, invited by the Polish King Władysław IV to his court in Warsaw, built a model aircraft with four fixed glider wings in 1647.  Described as "four pairs of wings attached to an elaborate 'dragon'", it was said to have successfully lifted a cat in 1648 but not Burattini himself. He promised that "only the most minor injuries" would result from landing the craft. His "Dragon Volant" is considered "the most elaborate and sophisticated aeroplane to be built before the 19th Century".

The first published paper on aviation was "Sketch of a Machine for Flying in the Air" by Emanuel Swedenborg published in 1716. This flying machine consisted of a light frame covered with strong canvas and provided with two large oars or wings moving on a horizontal axis, arranged so that the upstroke met with no resistance while the downstroke provided lifting power. Swedenborg knew that the machine would not fly, but suggested it as a start and was confident that the problem would be solved. He wrote: "It seems easier to talk of such a machine than to put it into actuality, for it requires greater force and less weight than exists in a human body. The science of mechanics might perhaps suggest a means, namely, a strong spiral spring. If these advantages and requisites are observed, perhaps in time to come someone might know how better to utilize our sketch and cause some addition to be made so as to accomplish that which we can only suggest. Yet there are sufficient proofs and examples from nature that such flights can take place without danger, although when the first trials are made you may have to pay for the experience, and not mind an arm or leg". Swedenborg would prove prescient in his observation that a method of powering of an aircraft was one of the critical problems to be overcome.

On 16 May 1793, the Spanish inventor Diego Marín Aguilera managed to cross the river Arandilla in Coruña del Conde, Castile, flying 300 – 400 m, with a flying machine.

19th century
Balloon jumping replaced tower jumping, also demonstrating with typically fatal results that man-power and flapping wings were useless in achieving flight. At the same time scientific study of heavier-than-air flight began in earnest.  In 1801, the French officer André Guillaume Resnier de Goué managed a 300-metre glide by starting from the top of the city walls of Angoulême and broke only one leg on arrival. In 1837 French mathematician and brigadier general Isidore Didion stated, "Aviation will be successful only if one finds an engine whose ratio with the weight of the device to be supported will be larger than current steam machines or the strength developed by humans or most of the animals".

Sir George Cayley and the first modern aircraft 
Sir George Cayley was first called the "father of the aeroplane" in 1846. During the last years of the previous century he had begun the first rigorous study of the physics of flight and would later design the first modern heavier-than-air craft. Among his many achievements, his most important contributions to aeronautics include:
 Clarifying our ideas and laying down the principles of heavier-than-air flight.
 Reaching a scientific understanding of the principles of bird flight.
 Conducting scientific aerodynamic experiments demonstrating drag and streamlining, movement of the centre of pressure, and the increase in lift from curving the wing surface.
 Defining the modern aeroplane configuration comprising a fixed-wing, fuselage and tail assembly.
 Demonstrations of manned, gliding flight.
 Setting out the principles of power-to-weight ratio in sustaining flight.

Cayley's first innovation was to study the basic science of lift by adopting the whirling arm test rig for use in aircraft research and using simple aerodynamic models on the arm, rather than attempting to fly a model of a complete design.

In 1799, he set down the concept of the modern aeroplane as a fixed-wing flying machine with separate systems for lift, propulsion, and control.

In 1804, Cayley constructed a model glider which was the first modern heavier-than-air flying machine, having the layout of a conventional modern aircraft with an inclined wing towards the front and adjustable tail at the back with both tailplane and fin. A movable weight allowed adjustment of the model's centre of gravity.

In 1809, goaded by the farcical antics of his contemporaries (see above), he began the publication of a landmark three-part treatise titled "On Aerial Navigation" (1809–1810). In it he wrote the first scientific statement of the problem, "The whole problem is confined within these limits, viz. to make a surface support a given weight by the application of power to the resistance of air". He identified the four vector forces that influence an aircraft: thrust, lift, drag and weight and distinguished stability and control in his designs. He also identified and described the importance of the cambered aerofoil, dihedral, diagonal bracing and drag reduction, and contributed to the understanding and design of ornithopters and parachutes.

In 1848, he had progressed far enough to construct a glider in the form of a triplane large and safe enough to carry a child. A local boy was chosen but his name is not known.

He went on to publish in 1852 the design for a full-size manned glider or "governable parachute" to be launched from a balloon and then to construct a version capable of launching from the top of a hill, which carried the first adult aviator across Brompton Dale in 1853.

Minor inventions included the rubber-powered motor, which provided a reliable power source for research models. By 1808, he had even re-invented the wheel, devising the tension-spoked wheel in which all compression loads are carried by the rim, allowing a lightweight undercarriage.

Age of steam

Drawing directly from Cayley's work, Henson's 1842 design for an aerial steam carriage broke new ground. Although only a design, it was the first in history for a propeller-driven fixed-wing aircraft.

1866 saw the founding of the Aeronautical Society of Great Britain and two years later the world's first aeronautical exhibition was held at the Crystal Palace, London, where John Stringfellow was awarded a £100 prize for the steam engine with the best power-to-weight ratio. In 1848, Stringfellow achieved the first powered flight using an unmanned  wingspan steam-powered monoplane built in a disused lace factory in Chard, Somerset. Employing two contra-rotating propellers on the first attempt, made indoors, the machine flew ten feet before becoming destabilised, damaging the craft. The second attempt was more successful, the machine leaving a guidewire to fly freely, achieving thirty yards of straight and level powered flight. Francis Herbert Wenham presented the first paper to the newly formed Aeronautical Society (later the Royal Aeronautical Society), On Aerial Locomotion. He advanced Cayley's work on cambered wings, making important findings. To test his ideas, from 1858 he had constructed several gliders, both manned and unmanned, and with up to five stacked wings. He realised that long, thin wings are better than bat-like ones because they have more leading edge for their area. Today this relationship is known as the aspect ratio of a wing.

The latter part of the 19th century became a period of intense study, characterized by the "gentleman scientists" who represented most research efforts until the 20th century. Among them was the British scientist-philosopher and inventor Matthew Piers Watt Boulton, who studied lateral flight control and was the first to patent an aileron control system in 1868.

In 1871, Wenham made the first wind tunnel using a fan, driven by a steam engine, to propel air down a  tube to the model.

Meanwhile, the British advances had galvanised French researchers. In 1857, Félix du Temple proposed a monoplane with a tailplane and retractable undercarriage. Developing his ideas with a model powered first by clockwork and later by steam, he eventually achieved a short hop with a full-size manned craft in 1874. It achieved lift-off under its own power after launching from a ramp, glided for a short time and returned safely to the ground, making it the first successful powered glide in history.

In 1865, Louis Pierre Mouillard published an influential book The Empire Of The Air (l'Empire de l'Air).

In 1856, Frenchman Jean-Marie Le Bris made the first flight higher than his point of departure, by having his glider "L'Albatros artificiel pulled by a horse on a beach. He reportedly achieved a height of 100 meters, over a distance of 200 meters.

Alphonse Pénaud, a Frenchman, advanced the theory of wing contours and aerodynamics and constructed successful models of aeroplanes, helicopters and ornithopters. Pénaud's model incorporated several of Cayley's discoveries, including the use of a tail, wing dihedral for inherent stability, and rubber power. The planophore also had longitudinal stability, being trimmed such that the tailplane was set at a smaller angle of incidence than the wings, an original and important contribution to the theory of aeronautics. Pénaud's later project for an amphibian aeroplane, although never built, incorporated other modern features. A tailless monoplane with a single vertical fin and twin tractor propellers, it also featured hinged rear elevator and rudder surfaces, retractable undercarriage and a fully enclosed, instrumented cockpit.

Equally authoritative as a theorist was Pénaud's fellow countryman Victor Tatin. In 1879, he flew a model which, like Pénaud's project, was a monoplane with twin tractor propellers but also had a separate horizontal tail. It was powered by compressed air. Flown tethered to a pole, this was the first model to take off under its own power.

In 1884, Alexandre Goupil published his work La Locomotion Aérienne (Aerial Locomotion), although the flying machine he later constructed failed to fly.

In 1890, the French engineer Clément Ader completed the first of three steam-driven flying machines, the Éole. His Avion III of 1897, notable only for having twin steam engines, failed to fly: Ader would later claim success and was not debunked until 1910 when the French Army published its report on his attempt.

Sir Hiram Maxim was an American engineer who had moved to England. Twin propellers were powered by two lightweight compound steam engines each delivering . It was intended as a test rig to investigate aerodynamic lift: lacking flight controls it ran on rails, with a second set of rails above the wheels to restrain it. Completed in 1894, on its third run it broke from the rail, became airborne for about 200 yards at two to three feet of altitude and was badly damaged upon falling back to the ground. It was subsequently repaired, but Maxim abandoned his experiments shortly afterwards.

Learning to glide; Otto Lilienthal and the first human flights

Around the last decade of the 19th century, a number of key figures were refining and defining the modern aeroplane. Lacking a suitable engine, aircraft work focused on stability and control in gliding flight. In 1879, Biot constructed a bird-like glider with the help of Massia and flew in it briefly. It is preserved in the Musee de l'Air, France, and is claimed to be the earliest man-carrying flying machine still in existence.

The Englishman Horatio Phillips made key contributions to aerodynamics. He conducted extensive wind tunnel research on aerofoil sections, proving the principles of aerodynamic lift foreseen by Cayley and Wenham. His findings underpin all modern aerofoil design. Between 1883 and 1886, the American John Joseph Montgomery developed a series of three manned gliders, before conducting his own independent investigations into aerodynamics and circulation of lift.

Otto Lilienthal became known as the "Glider King" or "Flying Man" of Germany. He duplicated Wenham's work and greatly expanded on it in 1884, publishing his research in 1889 as Birdflight as the Basis of Aviation (Der Vogelflug als Grundlage der Fliegekunst), which is seen as one of the most important works in aviation history. He also produced a series of hang gliders, including bat-wing, monoplane and biplane forms, such as the Derwitzer Glider and Normal soaring apparatus, which is considered to be the first air plane in series production, making the Maschinenfabrik Otto Lilienthal the first air plane production company in the world.

Starting in 1891, he became the first person to make controlled untethered glides routinely, and the first to be photographed flying a heavier-than-air machine, stimulating interest around the world. Lilienthal's work led to him developing the concept of the modern wing. His flights in the year 1891 are seen as the beginning of human flight and because of that he is often referred to as either the "father of aviation" or "father of flight".

He rigorously documented his work, including photographs, and for this reason is one of the best known of the early pioneers. Lilienthal made over 2,000 glides until his death in 1896 from injuries sustained in a glider crash.

Picking up where Lilienthal left off, Octave Chanute took up aircraft design after an early retirement, and funded the development of several gliders. In the summer of 1896, his team flew several of their designs eventually deciding that the best was a biplane design. Like Lilienthal, he documented and photographed his work.

In Britain Percy Pilcher, who had worked for Maxim, built and successfully flew several gliders during the mid to late 1890s.

The invention of the box kite during this period by the Australian Lawrence Hargrave would lead to the development of the practical biplane. In 1894, Hargrave linked four of his kites together, added a sling seat, and was the first to obtain lift with a heavier than air aircraft, when he flew up . Later pioneers of manned kite flying included Samuel Franklin Cody in England and Captain Génie Saconney in France.

Frost 

William Frost from Pembrokeshire, Wales started his project in 1880 and after 16 years, he designed a flying machine and in 1894 won a patent for a "Frost Aircraft Glider". 
Spectators witnessed the craft fly at Saundersfoot in 1896, traveling 500 yards before colliding with a tree and falling in a field.

Langley 

After a distinguished career in astronomy and shortly before becoming Secretary of the Smithsonian Institution, Samuel Pierpont Langley started a serious investigation into aerodynamics at what is today the University of Pittsburgh. In 1891, he published Experiments in Aerodynamics detailing his research, and then turned to building his designs. He hoped to achieve automatic aerodynamic stability, so he gave little consideration to in-flight control. On 6 May 1896, Langley's Aerodrome No. 5 made the first successful sustained flight of an unpiloted, engine-driven heavier-than-air craft of substantial size. It was launched from a spring-actuated catapult mounted on top of a houseboat on the Potomac River near Quantico, Virginia. On both occasions, the Aerodrome No. 5 landed in the water as planned, because, in order to save weight, it was not equipped with landing gear. On 28 November 1896, another successful flight was made with the Aerodrome No. 6. The Aerodrome No. 6 was actually Aerodrome No. 4 greatly modified. So little remained of the original aircraft that it was given a new designation.

With the successes of the Aerodrome No. 5 and No. 6, Langley started looking for funding to build a full-scale man-carrying version of his designs. Spurred by the Spanish–American War, the U.S. government granted him $50,000 to develop a man-carrying flying machine for aerial reconnaissance. Langley planned on building a scaled-up version known as the Aerodrome A, and started with the smaller Quarter-scale Aerodrome, which flew twice on 18 June 1901, and then again with a newer and more powerful engine in 1903.

With the basic design apparently successfully tested, he then turned to the problem of a suitable engine. He contracted Stephen Balzer to build one, but was disappointed when it delivered only  instead of the  he expected. Langley's assistant, Charles M. Manly, then reworked the design into a five-cylinder water-cooled radial that delivered  at 950 rpm, a feat that took years to duplicate. Now with both power and a design, Langley put the two together with great hopes.

To his dismay, the resulting aircraft proved to be too fragile. Simply scaling up the original small models resulted in a design that was too weak to hold itself together. Two launches in late 1903 both ended with the Aerodrome immediately crashing into the water. The pilot, Manly, was rescued each time. Also, the aircraft's control system was inadequate to allow quick pilot responses, and it had no method of lateral control, and the Aerodromes aerial stability was marginal.

Langley's attempts to gain further funding failed, and his efforts ended. Nine days after his second abortive launch on 8 December, the Wright brothers successfully flew their Flyer. Glenn Curtiss made 93 modifications to the Aerodrome and flew this very different aircraft in 1914. Without acknowledging the modifications, the Smithsonian Institution asserted that Langley's Aerodrome was the first machine "capable of flight".

Whitehead

Gustave Weißkopf was a German who emigrated to the U.S., where he soon changed his name to Whitehead. From 1897 to 1915, he designed and built early flying machines and engines. On 14 August 1901, two and a half years before the Wright Brothers' flight, he claimed to have carried out a controlled, powered flight in his Number 21 monoplane at Fairfield, Connecticut. The flight was reported in the Bridgeport Sunday Herald local newspaper. About 30 years later, several people questioned by a researcher claimed to have seen that or other Whitehead flights.

In March 2013, Jane's All the World's Aircraft, an authoritative source for contemporary aviation, published an editorial which accepted Whitehead's flight as the first manned, powered, controlled flight of a heavier-than-air craft. The Smithsonian Institution (custodians of the original Wright Flyer) and many aviation historians continue to maintain that Whitehead did not fly as suggested.

Pearse 

Richard Pearse was a New Zealand farmer and inventor who performed pioneering aviation experiments. Witnesses interviewed many years afterward claimed that Pearse flew and landed a powered heavier-than-air machine on 31 March 1903, nine months before the Wright brothers flew.  Documentary evidence for these claims remains open to interpretation and dispute, and Pearse himself never made such claims. In a newspaper interview in 1909, he said he did not "attempt anything practical ... until 1904". If he did fly in 1903, the flight appears to have been poorly controlled in comparison to the Wrights'.

Wright brothers 

Using a methodical approach and concentrating on the controllability of the aircraft, the brothers built and tested a series of kite and glider designs from 1898 to 1902 before attempting to build a powered design. The gliders worked, but not as well as the Wrights had expected based on the experiments and writings of their predecessors. Their first full-size glider, launched in 1900, had only about half the lift they anticipated. Their second glider, built the following year, performed even more poorly. Rather than giving up, the Wrights constructed their own wind tunnel and created a number of sophisticated devices to measure lift and drag on the 200 wing designs they tested. As a result, the Wrights corrected earlier mistakes in calculations regarding drag and lift. Their testing and calculating produced a third glider with a higher aspect ratio and true three-axis control. They flew it successfully hundreds of times in 1902, and it performed far better than the previous models. By using a rigorous system of experimentation, involving wind-tunnel testing of airfoils and flight testing of full-size prototypes, the Wrights not only built a working aircraft the following year, the Wright Flyer, but also helped advance the science of aeronautical engineering.

The Wrights appear to be the first to make serious studied attempts to simultaneously solve the power and control problems. Both problems proved difficult, but they never lost interest. They solved the control problem by inventing wing warping for roll control, combined with simultaneous yaw control with a steerable rear rudder. Almost as an afterthought, they designed and built a low-powered internal combustion engine. They also designed and carved wooden propellers that were more efficient than any before, enabling them to gain adequate performance from their low engine power. Although wing-warping as a means of lateral control was used only briefly during the early history of aviation, the principle of combining lateral control in combination with a rudder was a key advance in aircraft control. While many aviation pioneers appeared to leave safety largely to chance, the Wrights' design was greatly influenced by the need to teach themselves to fly without unreasonable risk to life and limb, by surviving crashes. This emphasis, as well as low engine power, was the reason for low flying speed and for taking off in a headwind. Performance, rather than safety, was the reason for the rear-heavy design because the canard could not be highly loaded; anhedral wings were less affected by crosswinds and were consistent with the low yaw stability.

According to the Smithsonian Institution and Fédération Aéronautique Internationale (FAI), the Wrights made the first sustained, controlled, powered heavier-than-air manned flight at Kill Devil Hills, North Carolina, four miles (8 km) south of Kitty Hawk, North Carolina on 17 December 1903.

In the fourth flight of the same day, Wilbur Wright flew  in 59 seconds. The flights were witnessed by three coastal lifesaving crewmen, a local businessman, and a boy from the village, making these the first public flights and the first well-documented ones.

Orville described the final flight of the day: "The first few hundred feet were up and down, as before, but by the time three hundred feet had been covered, the machine was under much better control. The course for the next four or five hundred feet had but little undulation. However, when out about eight hundred feet the machine began pitching again, and, in one of its darts downward, struck the ground. The distance over the ground was measured to be ; the time of the flight was 59 seconds. The frame supporting the front rudder was badly broken, but the main part of the machine was not injured at all. We estimated that the machine could be put in condition for flight again in about a day or two". They flew only about ten feet above the ground as a safety precaution, so they had little room to manoeuvre, and all four flights in the gusty winds ended in a bumpy and unintended "landing". Modern analysis by Professor Fred E. C. Culick and Henry R. Rex (1985) has demonstrated that the 1903 Wright Flyer was so unstable as to be almost unmanageable by anyone but the Wrights, who had trained themselves in the 1902 glider.

The Wrights continued flying at Huffman Prairie near Dayton, Ohio in 1904–05. In May 1904 they introduced the Flyer II, a heavier and improved version of the original Flyer. On 23 June 1905, they first flew a third machine, the Flyer III. After a severe crash on 14 July 1905, they rebuilt the Flyer III and made important design changes. They almost doubled the size of the elevator and rudder and moved them about twice the distance from the wings. They added two fixed vertical vanes (called "blinkers") between the elevators and gave the wings a very slight dihedral. They disconnected the rudder from the wing-warping control, and as in all future aircraft, placed it on a separate control handle. When flights resumed the results were immediate. The serious pitch instability that hampered Flyers I and II was significantly reduced, so repeated minor crashes were eliminated. Flights with the redesigned Flyer III started lasting over 10 minutes, then 20, then 30. Flyer III became the first practical aircraft (though without wheels and needing a launching device), flying consistently under full control and bringing its pilot back to the starting point safely and landing without damage. On 5 October 1905, Wilbur flew  in 39 minutes 23 seconds."

According to the April 1907 issue of the Scientific American magazine, the Wright brothers seemed to have the most advanced knowledge of heavier-than-air navigation at the time. However, the same magazine issue also claimed that no public flight had been made in the United States before its April 1907 issue. Hence, they devised the Scientific American Aeronautic Trophy in order to encourage the development of a heavier-than-air flying machine.

Pioneer Era (1903–1914) 

This period saw the development of practical aeroplanes and airships and their early application, alongside balloons and kites, for private, sport and military use.

Pioneers in Europe

Although full details of the Wright Brothers' system of flight control had been published in l'Aerophile in January 1906, the importance of this advance was not recognised, and European experimenters generally concentrated on attempting to produce inherently stable machines.

Short powered flights were performed in France by Romanian engineer Traian Vuia on 18 March and 19 August 1906 when he flew 12 and 24 meters, respectively, in a self-designed, fully self-propelled, fixed-wing aircraft, that possessed a fully wheeled undercarriage. He was followed by Jacob Ellehammer who built a monoplane which he tested with a tether in Denmark on 12 September 1906, flying 42 meters.

On 13 September 1906, a day after Ellehammer's tethered flight and three years after the Wright Brothers' flight, the Brazilian Alberto Santos-Dumont made a public flight in Paris with the 14-bis, also known as Oiseau de proie (French for "bird of prey"). On 12 November 1906, Santos-Dumont set the first world record recognized by the Federation Aeronautique Internationale by flying  in 21.5 seconds. Only one more brief flight was made by the 14-bis in March 1907, after which it was abandoned.

In March 1907, Gabriel Voisin flew the first example of his Voisin biplane. On 13 January 1908, a second example of the type was flown by Henri Farman to win the Deutsch-Archdeacon Grand Prix d'Aviation prize for a flight in which the aircraft flew a distance of more than a kilometer and landed at the point where it had taken off. The flight lasted 1 minute and 28 seconds.

Flight as an established technology

Santos-Dumont later added ailerons between the wings in an effort to gain more lateral stability. His final design, first flown in 1907, was the series of Demoiselle monoplanes (Nos. 19 to 22). The Demoiselle No 19 could be constructed in only 15 days and became the world's first series production aircraft. The Demoiselle achieved 120 km/h.  The fuselage consisted of three specially reinforced bamboo booms: the pilot sat in a seat between the main wheels of a conventional landing gear whose pair of wire-spoked mainwheels were located at the lower front of the airframe, with a tailskid half-way back beneath the rear fuselage structure. The Demoiselle was controlled in flight by a cruciform tail unit hinged on a form of universal joint at the aft end of the fuselage structure to function as elevator and rudder, with roll control provided through wing warping (No. 20), with the wings only warping "down".

In 1908, Wilbur Wright travelled to Europe, and starting in August gave a series of flight demonstrations at Le Mans in France. The first demonstration, made on 8 August, attracted an audience including most of the major French aviation experimenters, who were astonished by the clear superiority of the Wright Brothers' aircraft, particularly its ability to make tight controlled turns. The importance of using roll control in making turns was recognised by almost all the European experimenters: Henri Farman fitted ailerons to his Voisin biplane and shortly afterwards set up his own aircraft construction business, whose first product was the influential Farman III biplane.

The following year saw the widespread recognition of powered flight as something other than the preserve of dreamers and eccentrics. On 25 July 1909, Louis Blériot won worldwide fame by winning a £1,000 prize offered by the British Daily Mail newspaper for a flight across the English Channel, and in August around half a million people, including the President of France Armand Fallières and David Lloyd George, attended one of the first aviation meetings, the Grande Semaine d'Aviation at Reims.

In 1914, pioneering aviator Tony Jannus captained the inaugural flight of the St. Petersburg-Tampa Airboat Line, the world's first commercial passenger airline.

Historians disagree about whether the Wright brothers patent war impeded development of the aviation industry in the United States compared to Europe. The patent war ended during World War I when the government pressured the industry into forming a patent pool, and major litigants had left the industry.

Rotorcraft 
In 1877, Enrico Forlanini developed an unmanned helicopter powered by a steam engine. It rose to a height of 13 meters, where it remained for 20 seconds, after a vertical take-off from a park in Milan.

The first time a manned helicopter is known to have risen off the ground was on a tethered flight in 1907 by the Breguet-Richet Gyroplane. Later the same year the Cornu helicopter, also French, made the first rotary-winged free flight at Lisieux, France. However, these were not practical designs.

Military use 

Almost as soon as they were invented, airplanes were used for military purposes. The first country to use them for military purposes was Italy, whose aircraft made reconnaissance, bombing and artillery correction flights in Libya during the Italian-Turkish war (September 1911 – October 1912). The first mission (a reconnaissance) occurred on 23 October 1911. The first bombing mission was flown on 1 November 1911. Then Bulgaria followed this example. Its airplanes attacked and reconnoitered the Ottoman positions during the First Balkan War 1912–13. The first war to see major use of airplanes in offensive, defensive and reconnaissance capabilities was World War I. The Allies and Central Powers both used airplanes and airships extensively.

While the concept of using the airplane as an offensive weapon was generally discounted before World War I, the idea of using it for photography was one that was not lost on any of the major forces. All of the major forces in Europe had light aircraft, typically derived from pre-war sporting designs, attached to their reconnaissance departments. Radiotelephones were also being explored on airplanes, notably the SCR-68, as communication between pilots and ground commander grew more and more important.

World War I (1914–1918)

Combat schemes 

It was not long before aircraft were shooting at each other, but the lack of any sort of steady point for the gun was a problem. The French solved this problem when, in late 1914, Roland Garros attached a fixed machine gun to the front of his plane, but while Adolphe Pegoud would become known as the first "ace", getting credit for five victories before also becoming the first ace to die in action, it was German Luftstreitkräfte Leutnant Kurt Wintgens who, on 1 July 1915, scored the very first aerial victory by a purpose-built fighter plane, with a synchronized machine gun.

Aviators were styled as modern-day knights, doing individual combat with their enemies. Several pilots became famous for their air-to-air combat; the most well known is Manfred von Richthofen, better known as the "Red Baron", who shot down 80 planes in air-to-air combat with several different planes, the most celebrated of which was the Fokker Dr.I. On the Allied side, René Paul Fonck is credited with the most all-time victories at 75, even when later wars are considered.

France, Britain, Germany, and Italy were the leading manufacturers of fighter planes that saw action during the war, with German aviation technologist Hugo Junkers showing the way to the future through his pioneering use of all-metal aircraft from late 1915.

Between the World Wars (1918–1939)

 

The years between World War I and World War II saw great advancements in aircraft technology. Airplanes evolved from low-powered biplanes made from wood and fabric to sleek, high-powered monoplanes made of aluminum, based primarily on the founding work of Hugo Junkers during the World War I period and its adoption by American designer William Bushnell Stout and Soviet designer Andrei Tupolev. The age of the great rigid airships came and went. The first successful rotorcraft appeared in the form of the autogyro, invented by Spanish engineer Juan de la Cierva and first flown in 1919. In this design, the rotor is not powered but is spun like a windmill by its passage through the air. A separate powerplant is used to propel the aircraft forwards.

After World War I, experienced fighter pilots were eager to show off their skills. Many American pilots became barnstormers, flying into small towns across the country and showing off their flying abilities, as well as taking paying passengers for rides. Eventually, the barnstormers grouped into more organized displays. Air shows sprang up around the country, with air races, acrobatic stunts, and feats of air superiority. The air races drove engine and airframe development—the Schneider Trophy, for example, led to a series of ever faster and sleeker monoplane designs culminating in the Supermarine S.6B. With pilots competing for cash prizes, there was an incentive to go faster. Amelia Earhart was perhaps the most famous of those on the barnstorming/air show circuit. She was also the first female pilot to achieve records such as the crossing of the Atlantic and Pacific Oceans.

Other prizes, for distance and speed records, also drove development forwards. For example, on 14 June 1919, Captain John Alcock and Lieutenant Arthur Brown co-piloted a Vickers Vimy non-stop from St. John's, Newfoundland to Clifden, Ireland, winning the £13,000 ($65,000) Northcliffe prize. The first flight across the South Atlantic and the first aerial crossing using astronomical navigation, was made by the naval aviators Gago Coutinho and Sacadura Cabral in 1922, from Lisbon, Portugal, to Rio de Janeiro, Brazil, with only internal means of navigation, in an aircraft specifically fitted for himself with an artificial horizon for aeronautical use, an invention that revolutionized air navigation at the time (Gago Coutinho invented a type of sextant incorporating two spirit levels to provide an artificial horizon). Five years later Charles Lindbergh received the Orteig Prize of $25,000 for the first solo non-stop crossing of the Atlantic. This caused what was known in aviation at the time as the "Lindbergh boom", where the volume of mail moving by air increased 50 percent, applications for pilots' licenses tripled, and the number of planes quadrupled all within six months of the flight. About three months after Lindbergh, Paul Redfern was the first to solo the Caribbean Sea and went missing flying over Venezuela.

Australian Sir Charles Kingsford Smith was the first to fly across the larger Pacific Ocean in the Southern Cross. His crew left Oakland, California to make the first trans-Pacific flight to Australia in three stages. This was the toughest part of the journey as they flew through a massive lightning storm near the equator. They then flew on to Brisbane in 20 hours, where they landed on 9 June 1928 after approximately  total flight. On arrival, Kingsford Smith was met by a huge crowd of 25,000 at Eagle Farm Airport in his hometown of Brisbane. Accompanying him were Australian aviator Charles Ulm as the relief pilot, and the Americans James Warner and Captain Harry Lyon (who were the radio operator, navigator and engineer). A week after they landed, Kingsford Smith and Ulm recorded a disc for Columbia talking about their trip. With Ulm, Kingsford Smith later continued his journey being the first in 1929 to circumnavigate the world, crossing the equator twice.

The first lighter-than-air crossings of the Atlantic were made by airship in July 1919 by His Majesty's Airship R34 and crew when they flew from East Lothian, Scotland to Long Island, New York and then back to Pulham, England. By 1929, airship technology had advanced to the point that the first round-the-world flight was completed by the Graf Zeppelin in September and in October, the same aircraft inaugurated the first commercial transatlantic service. However, the age of the rigid airship ended following the destruction by fire of the zeppelin LZ 129 Hindenburg just before landing at Lakehurst, New Jersey on 6 May 1937, killing 35 of the 97 people aboard. Previous spectacular airship accidents, from the Wingfoot Express disaster (1919) to the loss of the R101 (1930), the Akron (1933) and the Macon (1935) had already cast doubt on airship safety, but with the disasters of the U.S. Navy's rigids showing the importance of solely using helium as the lifting medium; following the destruction of the Hindenburg, the remaining airship making international flights, the Graf Zeppelin was retired (June 1937). Its replacement, the rigid airship Graf Zeppelin II, made a number of flights, primarily over Germany, from 1938 to 1939, but was grounded when Germany began World War II. Both remaining German zeppelins were scrapped in 1940 to supply metal for the German Luftwaffe; the last American rigid airship, the Los Angeles, which had not flown since 1932, was dismantled in late 1939.

Meanwhile, Germany, which was restricted by the Treaty of Versailles in its development of powered aircraft, developed gliding as a sport, especially at the Wasserkuppe, during the 1920s. In its various forms, in the 21st-century sailplane aviation now has over 400,000 participants. Fritz von Opel was instrumental in popularizing rockets as means of propulsion for vehicles and planes. In the 1920s, he initiated together with Max Valier, co-founder of the "Verein für Raumschiffahrt", the world's first rocket program, Opel-RAK, leading to speed records for automobiles, rail vehicles and the first manned rocket-powered flight in September 1929. To build the world's first rocket glider, Opel and Valier collaborated with Wasserkuppe pioneers Lippisch, Stamer and Hatry. Months earlier in 1928, one of his rocket-powered ground prototypes, the Opel RAK2, reached piloted by von Opel himself at the AVUS speedway in Berlin a record speed of 238 km/h, watched by 3000 spectators and world media, among them Fritz Lang, director of Metropolis and Woman in the Moon, world boxing champion Max Schmeling and many more sports and show business celebrities. A world record for rail vehicles was reached with RAK3 and a top speed of 256 km/h. After these successes on land and successful glider tests at  Wasserkuppe, on 30 September 1929, von Opel piloted the world's first public rocket-powered flight using a dedicated Opel RAK.1 rocket plane designed by Julius Hatry.  World media reported on these efforts, including UNIVERSAL Newsreel of the US, causing immense global public attention. The Great Depression led to an end of the Opel-RAK program, but Max Valier continued the efforts. After switching from solid-fuel to liquid-fuel rockets, he died while testing and is considered the first fatality of the dawning space age.

In 1929, Jimmy Doolittle developed instrument flight.

1929 also saw the first flight of by far the largest plane ever built until then: the Dornier Do X with a wingspan of 48 m. On its 70th test flight on 21 October 1929, there were 169 people on board, a record that was not broken for 20 years.

Less than a decade after the development of the first practical rotorcraft of any type with the autogyro, in the Soviet Union, Boris N. Yuriev and Alexei M. Cheremukhin, two aeronautical engineers working at the Tsentralniy Aerogidrodinamicheskiy Institut, constructed and flew the TsAGI 1-EA single rotor helicopter, which used an open tubing framework, a four-blade main rotor, and twin sets of  diameter anti-torque rotors; one set of two at the nose and one set of two at the tail. Powered by two M-2 powerplants, up-rated copies of the Gnome Monosoupape rotary radial engine of World War I, the TsAGI 1-EA made several successful low altitude flights.

Only five years after the German Dornier Do-X had flown, Tupolev designed the largest aircraft of the 1930s era, the Maksim Gorky in the Soviet Union by 1934, as the largest aircraft ever built using the Junkers methods of metal aircraft construction.

In the 1930s, development of the jet engine began in Germany and in Britain – both countries would go on to develop jet aircraft by the end of World War II.

After enrolling in the Military Aviation Academy in Eskisehir in 1936 and undertaking training at the First Aircraft Regiment, Sabiha Gökçen, flew fighter and bomber planes becoming the first Turkish, female aviator and the world's first, female, combat pilot. During her flying career, she achieved some 8,000 hours, 32 of which were combat missions.

World War II (1939–1945) 

World War II saw a great increase in the pace of development and production, not only of aircraft but also the associated flight-based weapon delivery systems. Air combat tactics and doctrines took advantage. Large-scale strategic bombing campaigns were launched, fighter escorts introduced and the more flexible aircraft and weapons allowed precise attacks on small targets with dive bombers, fighter-bombers, and ground-attack aircraft. New technologies like radar also allowed more coordinated and controlled deployment of air defense.

The first jet aircraft to fly was the Heinkel He 178 (Germany), flown by Erich Warsitz in 1939, followed by the world's first operational jet aircraft, the Me 262, in July 1942 and world's first jet-powered bomber, the Arado Ar 234, in June 1943. British developments, like the Gloster Meteor, followed afterwards, but saw only brief use in World War II. However, jet and rocket aircraft had only limited impact due to their late introduction, fuel shortages, the lack of experienced pilots and the declining war industry of Germany.

Not only airplanes, but also helicopters saw rapid development in the Second World War, with the introduction of the Focke Achgelis Fa 223, the Flettner Fl 282 synchropter in 1941 in Germany and the Sikorsky R-4 in 1942 in the USA.

Postwar era (1945–1979) 

After World War II, commercial aviation grew rapidly, using mostly ex-military aircraft to transport people and cargo. This growth was accelerated by the glut of heavy and super-heavy bomber airframes like the B-29 and Lancaster that could be converted into commercial aircraft. The DC-3 also made for easier and longer commercial flights. The first commercial jet airliner to fly was the British de Havilland Comet. By 1952, the British state airline BOAC had introduced the Comet into scheduled service. While a technical achievement, the plane suffered a series of highly public failures, as the shape of the windows led to cracks due to metal fatigue. The fatigue was caused by cycles of pressurization and depressurization of the cabin and eventually led to catastrophic failure of the plane's fuselage. By the time the problems were overcome, other jet airliner designs had already taken to the skies.

USSR's Aeroflot became the first airline in the world to operate sustained regular jet services on 15 September 1956 with the Tupolev Tu-104. The Boeing 707 and DC-8 which established new levels of comfort, safety and passenger expectations, ushered in the age of mass commercial air travel, dubbed the Jet Age.

In October 1947, Chuck Yeager took the rocket-powered Bell X-1 through the sound barrier. Although anecdotal evidence exists that some fighter pilots may have done so while dive-bombing ground targets during the war, this was the first controlled, level flight to exceed the speed of sound. Further barriers of distance fell in 1948 and 1952 with the first jet crossing of the Atlantic and the first nonstop flight to Australia.

The 1945 invention of nuclear bombs briefly increased the strategic importance of military aircraft in the Cold War between East and West. Even a moderate fleet of long-range bombers could deliver a deadly blow to the enemy, so great efforts were made to develop countermeasures. At first, the supersonic interceptor aircraft were produced in considerable numbers. By 1955, most development efforts shifted to guided surface-to-air missiles. However, the approach diametrically changed when a new type of nuclear-carrying platform appeared that could not be stopped in any feasible way: intercontinental ballistic missiles. The possibility of these was demonstrated in 1957 with the launch of Sputnik 1 by the Soviet Union. This action started the Space Race between the nations.

In 1961, the sky was no longer the limit for manned flight, as Yuri Gagarin orbited once around the planet within 108 minutes, and then used the descent module of Vostok I to safely reenter the atmosphere and reduce speed from Mach 25 using friction and converting the kinetic energy of the velocity into heat. The United States responded by launching Alan Shepard into space on a suborbital flight in a Mercury space capsule. With the launch of the Alouette I in 1963, Canada became the third country to send a satellite into space. The space race between the United States and the Soviet Union would ultimately lead to the landing of men on the Moon in 1969.

Aside from vehicles designed to fly in outer space, this record was renewed by X-43 in the 21st century.

The Harrier jump jet, often referred to as just "Harrier" or "the jump jet", is a British designed military jet aircraft capable of Vertical/Short Takeoff and Landing (V/STOL) via thrust vectoring. It first flew in 1969, the same year that Neil Armstrong and Buzz Aldrin set foot on the moon, and Boeing unveiled the Boeing 747 and the Aérospatiale-BAC Concorde supersonic passenger airliner had its maiden flight. The Boeing 747 was the largest commercial passenger aircraft ever to fly, and still carries millions of passengers each year, though it has been superseded by the Airbus A380, which is capable of carrying up to 853 passengers. In 1975, Aeroflot started regular service on the Tu-144—the first supersonic passenger plane. In 1976, British Airways and Air France began supersonic service across the Atlantic, with Concorde. A few years earlier the SR-71 Blackbird had set the record for crossing the Atlantic in under 2 hours, and Concorde followed in its footsteps.

In 1979, the Gossamer Albatross became the first human-powered aircraft to cross the English channel. This achievement finally saw the realization of centuries of dreams of human flight.

Digital age (1980–present) 

The last quarter of the 20th century saw a change of emphasis.  No longer was revolutionary progress made in flight speeds, distances and materials technology.  This part of the century instead saw the spreading of the digital revolution both in flight avionics and in aircraft design and manufacturing techniques.

In 1986, Dick Rutan and Jeana Yeager flew an aircraft, the Rutan Voyager, around the world unrefuelled, and without landing. In 1999, Bertrand Piccard became the first person to circle the earth in a balloon.

Digital fly-by-wire systems allow an aircraft to be designed with relaxed static stability. Initially used to increase the manoeuvrability of military aircraft such as the General Dynamics F-16 Fighting Falcon, this is now being used to reduce drag on commercial airliners.

The U.S. Centennial of Flight Commission was established in 1999 to encourage the broadest national and international participation in the celebration of 100 years of powered flight. It publicized and encouraged a number of programs, projects and events intended to educate people about the history of aviation.

21st century
21st-century aviation has seen increasing interest in fuel savings and fuel diversification, as well as low cost airlines and facilities. Additionally, much of the developing world that did not have good access to air transport has been steadily adding aircraft and facilities, though severe congestion remains a problem in many up and coming nations. Around 20,000 city pairs are served by commercial aviation, up from less than 10,000 as recently as 1996.

There appears to be newfound interest in returning to the supersonic era whereby waning demand in the turn of the 20th century made flights unprofitable, as well as the final commercial stoppage of the Concorde due to reduced demand following a fatal accident and rising costs.

At the beginning of the 21st century, digital technology allowed subsonic military aviation to begin eliminating the pilot in favor of remotely operated or completely autonomous unmanned aerial vehicles (UAVs). In April 2001 the unmanned aircraft Global Hawk flew from Edwards AFB in the US to Australia non-stop and unrefuelled. This is the longest point-to-point flight ever undertaken by an unmanned aircraft and took 23 hours and 23 minutes. In October 2003, the first totally autonomous flight across the Atlantic by a computer-controlled model aircraft occurred. UAVs are now an established feature of modern warfare, carrying out pinpoint attacks under the control of a remote operator.

Major disruptions to air travel in the 21st century included the closing of U.S. airspace due to the September 11 attacks, and the closing of most of European airspace after the 2010 eruption of Eyjafjallajökull.

The flight took nearly five days; during the nights the aircraft used its batteries and the potential energy gained during the day.

On 14 July 2019, Frenchman Franky Zapata attracted worldwide attention when he participated at the Bastille Day military parade riding his invention, a jet-powered Flyboard Air. He subsequently succeeded in crossing the English Channel on his device on 4 August 2019, covering the 35-kilometre (22 mi) journey from Sangatte in northern France to St Margaret's Bay in Kent, UK, in 22 minutes, with a midpoint fueling stop included.

24 July 2019 was the busiest day in aviation, for Flightradar24 recorded a total of over 225,000 flights that day. It includes helicopters, private jets, gliders, sight-seeing flights, as well as personal aircraft. The website has been tracking flights since 2006.

On 10 June 2020, the Pipistrel Velis Electro became the first electric aeroplane to secure a type certificate from EASA.

In the early 21st Century, the first fifth-generation military fighters were produced, starting with the F-22 Raptor and currently Russia, America and China have 5th gen aircraft (2019).

The COVID-19 pandemic had a significant impact on the aviation industry due to the resulting travel restrictions as well as slump in demand among travelers, and may also affect the future of air travel. For example, the mandatory use of face masks on airplanes has become a common feature of flying since 2020.

Mars 
On 19 April 2021, NASA successfully flew an unmanned helicopter on Mars, making it humanity's first controlled powered flight on another planet. The Ingenuity helicopter rose to a height of 3 meters, and hovered in a stable holding position for 30 seconds, after a vertical take-off that was filmed by its accompanying rover, Perseverance. On 22 April 2021, Ingenuity made a second, more complex flight, which was also observed by Perseverance. As a homage to all of its aerial predecessors, the Ingenuity helicopter carries with it a postage sized fragment from the wing of the 1903 Wright Flyer.

See also 

 Aviation archaeology
 Claims to the first powered flight
 List of firsts in aviation
 Timeline of aviation

References

Bibliography

Further reading 

 Celebrating a History of Flight, NASA Office of Aerospace Technology HQ, United States Air Force
 Harry Bruno (1944) Wings over America: The Story of American Aviation, Halcyon House, Garden City, New York.
 
 Hynes, Samuel (1988). Flights of Passage: Reflections of a World War II Aviator. New York: Frederic C. Beil / Annapolis:Naval Institute Press.
   Includes photos, diagrams and specifications of many c. 1910 aircraft.
  Includes photos and specifics of many c. 1908 dirigibles and airplanes.

 Van Vleck, Jenifer (2013). Empire of the Air: Aviation and the American Ascendancy. Cambridge, MA: Harvard University Press.

External links

Articles

Media 
 
 
 

 
Articles containing video clips
History of industries
History of science by discipline
History of technology